Kerry Brothers Jr. (born October 1, 1970), also known as "Krucial", is an American record producer, songwriter and hip hop artist. Brothers and singer-songwriter Alicia Keys began a musical partnership in the mid-1990s, co-writing and co-producing together a number of songs from her first four albums. He received two Grammy Awards from his collaborative work with Keys: Best R&B Album for Songs in A Minor and Best R&B Song for "No One".

In 2006, Brothers released his debut EP Take Da Hood Back. Brothers co-wrote songs that appeared on the soundtracks of the films Dr. Dolittle, Shaft, and Ali. He has also worked with other R&B and hip hop artists including Mario, Rakim, Angie Stone, Nas, Keyshia Cole, Goapele, Drake and K'naan.

Early life
Brothers was born in Brooklyn and grew up in Harlem and Far Rockaway, Queens.

Career
Initially a teen rapper, Brothers was signed to B-Boy Records and released a 2 sided single "Who Am I" and "We Are The Move" in 1988 with then partner Marcel Brooks. The group was called K-Bee & Ceil B. After being shelved for not seeing eye to eye with the label the group split up. Brothers then started to make beats himself for him to rap to. In the early 90's Brothers moved to Harlem and was part of the "Hard Pack" mixtapes and would frequent open mics.  At the same time he was a founding member of a collective called "Melanin 2000" who frequent Nuyoricans Poet Café and Lyricist Lounge downtown in NYC Greenwich Village. Later on it was there in Washington Square Park he met Alicia Keys.   

Brothers and Keys co-owned a production company, KrucialKeys, based in New York, and together they co-founded and co-owned a recording studio, The Oven Studios, in Long Island, New York. He received two Grammy Awards from his collaborative work with Keys: Best R&B Album for Songs in A Minor and Best R&B Song for "No One".

In 2006, Brothers released his debut EP Take Da Hood Back. Brothers has also co-wrote songs that have appeared on the soundtracks of the films Dr. Dolittle, Shaft, and Ali.

References

African-American songwriters
Songwriters from New York (state)
Alicia Keys
American hip hop record producers
Living people
1970 births
Grammy Award winners